This article lists the squads for the 2023 Pinatar Cup, the third edition of the Pinatar Cup. The tournament will consist of a series of friendly matches to be held in Spain from 15 to 21 February 2023.

The age listed for each player is on 15 February 2023, the first day of the tournament. The numbers of caps and goals listed for each player do not include any matches played after the start of tournament. The club listed is the club for which the player last played a competitive match prior to the tournament. The nationality for each club reflects the national association (not the league) to which the club is affiliated. A flag is included for coaches that are of a different nationality than their own national team.

Squads

Iceland
Coach: Þorsteinn Halldórsson

The final squad was announced on 3 February 2023. On 12 February 2023, Svava Rós Guðmundsdóttir withdrew from the squad and was replaced by Diljá Ýr Zomers.

Philippines
Coach:  Alen Stajcic

The final squad was announced on 2 February 2023.

Scotland
Coach:  Pedro Martínez Losa

The final squad was announced on 1 February 2023.

Wales
Coach:  Gemma Grainger

The final squad was announced on 8 February 2023.

Player representation

By club
Clubs with three or more players represented are listed.

By club nationality

By club federation

By representatives of domestic league

References

Pinatar Cup